Gemmula gilchristi is a species of sea snail, a marine gastropod mollusk in the family Turridae, the turrids.

Description
The length of the shell of the holotype attains 32 mm, its width 11 mm.

(Original description) The elongately fusiform shell is posterior longer than the anterior.  It is whitish tinged, and banded with pale yellow- The spire is elongately turreted, slightly convex at the sides, acute at the apex. It contains 12 whorls. The apical ones are smooth, rounded and regular The rest are sloping, scarcely convex, with a double keel above, beneath which is a deepish rut, and about
the middle of the whorl a stouter keel ornamented with rather close-set, gem-like tubercles. The interstices between the keels are ridged and grooved. The suture of the upper whorls is transversely plicate, and of the lower narrowly canaliculate. The body whorl is rather convex with the tubercles, becoming longitudinally narrower, and the keel bearing them less prominent, beneath which there are several acute keels and intervening lirae. The whorl is also sculptured with numerous obliquely-curved longitudinal plicae. The rostrum is of moderate length. The aperture is elongately sub-oval. The sinus is rather deep, and not very wide. The siphonal canal is open, moderately wide, and slightly curved.

Distribution
This marine species occurs off South Africa, Zanzibar, Andaman Islands, New Guinea, and Japan; in the East China Sea, the South China Sea.

References

 Sowerby, G. B., III. (1902). Mollusca of South Africa. Marine Investigations of South Africa. 2: 93–100, pl. 2.
 Steyn, D.G & Lussi, M. (2005). Offshore Shells of Southern Africa: A pictorial guide to more than 750 Gastropods. Published by the authors. Pp. i–vi, 1–289.
 Li B. [Baoquan] & Li X. [Xinzheng]. (2008). Report on the turrid genera Gemmula, Lophiotoma and Ptychosyrinx (Gastropoda: Turridae: Turrinae) from the China seas. Zootaxa. 1778: 1-25.
 Liu J.Y. [Ruiyu] (ed.). (2008). Checklist of marine biota of China seas. China Science Press. 1267 pp.

External links
 
 Tucker, J.K. 2004 Catalog of recent and fossil turrids (Mollusca: Gastropoda). Zootaxa 682:1-1295.

gilchristi
Gastropods described in 1902